Burunlu or Bürünlü may refer to:
Bürünlü, Zangilan, Azerbaijan
Burunlu, Zardab, Azerbaijan